Wegea is a genus of fungi within the order Arthoniales. The genus has not been placed into a family. This is a monotypic genus, containing the single species Wegea tylophorelloides. The genus was circumscribed in 1997 by André Aptroot and Leif Tibell. The species have a morphology similar to calicioid fungi, but does not form a mazaedium.

References

Arthoniomycetes
Arthoniomycetes genera
Taxa named by André Aptroot
Taxa named by Leif Tibell
Taxa described in 1997